Middleton is a civil parish in the South Lakeland District of Cumbria, England.  It contains 22 listed buildings that are recorded in the National Heritage List for England.  Of these, five are listed at Grade II*, the middle of the three grades, and the others are at Grade II, the lowest grade.  The parish contains the village of Middleton, and is otherwise rural.  Most of the listed buildings are houses and associated structures, farmhouses and farm buildings.  The other listed buildings include milestones, one of which dates back to the Roman era, a church and items in the churchyard, and bridges.


Key

Buildings

References

Citations

Sources

Lists of listed buildings in Cumbria